Phameas (fl. 2nd Century BC), sometimes also known as Hamilcar or Himilco Phameas, was a Carthaginian officer during the Third Punic War.

He is first mentioned in the preliminary hostilities between Rome and Carthage (149 BC), as either a notable cavalry leader or the leader of the Carthaginian cavalry. Greco-Roman historians speak positively of him, with Polybius depicting him as "in the prime of life, of great personal vigor, and - what is most important in a soldier - a good and bold rider". Appian calls him "a man eager for fighting".

His forces carried out several attacks on disorganised and scattered Roman units and scouting parties, causing much damage among Roman forces. One of his more well-known engagements was the Battle of Lake Tunis, where he annihilated several foraging parties sent by consul Lucius Marcius Censorinus, and playing a role in the Carthaginian repulse of the Roman assault. However, he was unable to break the well-organised groups of Scipio Aemilianus.
 
The Romans eventually managed to curtail his activities by assaulting his hidden raiding bases.

In early 148 BC, Scipio and Phameas came to an understanding, and the latter defected to the Romans, along with 2,200 of his cavalry. For this, he was richly rewarded. Appian writes that he was given:

After this, he is not mentioned in the sources. It is possible that he was given Roman citizenship.

References

External links
Appian, The Punic Wars 
Phameas, www.livius.org

2nd-century BC Punic people
Carthaginian generals
Carthaginians